Sulfamoyl fluoride in organic chemistry is a functional group that has the chemical formula F-SO2-N(-R)-R'.

Examples include sulfamyl fluoride, where R, R' is H; difluorosulfamyl fluoride, where R and R' is F; dimethylsulfamoyl fluoride where R and R' is a methyl CH3 group; N-sulfinylsulfamoyl fluoride where R, R1 are replaced by a double bond to S=O; chloro(trifluoro-methyl)sulfamoyl fluoride where R=Cl and R' is trifluoromethyl CF3.

Others include bis(trifluoromethyl)-sulfamoyl fluoride; 1,2-hydrazinedisulfonyl fluoride (which is an inorganic dimer).

It can be contrasted with the sulfonimidoyl fluorides with structure R-S(O)(F)=N-R'.

Production
Sulfamoyl fluorides can be made by treating secondary amines with sulfuryl fluoride (SO2F2) or sulfuryl chloride fluoride (SO2ClF). Cyclic secondary amines work as well, provided they are not aromatic.

Sulfamoyl fluorides can also be made from sulfamoyl chlorides, by reacting with a substance that can supply the fluoride ion, such as NaF, KF, HF, or SbF3.

Sulfonamides can undergo a Hofmann rearrangement when treated with a difluoro-λ3-bromane to yield a singly substituted N-sulfamoyl fluoride.

See also
Fluorosulfonate
Sulfonyl halide
Sulfuryl fluoride

References

Functional groups
Leaving groups